Cayla Ann Tomšs Murray (born 19 July 1994) is a South African politician and former civil servant who has served as the chairperson of the Standing Committee on Finance, Economic Opportunities and Tourism in the Western Cape Provincial Parliament and as a Democratic Alliance Member of the Provincial Parliament since August 2022.

Early life and education
Murray was born on 19 July 1994. Murray studied International Relations and Politics at Brunel University London, graduating with a first in 2016. She completed her postgraduate studies in African Politics at SOAS University of London in 2017, also graduating with a first.

Career
Murray worked as an assistant researcher at Brunel University from November 2013 to March 2014, as an administrator for Liberal Democrat Women from June 2016 to September 2017, as a Media Researcher and Content Producer at the Democratic Alliance from January 2018 to October 2018, and as spokesperson to the Western Cape Minister of Social Development from October 2018 until June 2019 before working as spokesperson to the Western Cape Minister of Community Safety between June 2019 and April 2021. Murray worked as spokesperson to Western Cape Premier Alan Winde from April 2021 before joining the Western Cape Provincial Parliament in August 2022.

Provincial Parliament
Murray was sworn in as a Democratic Alliance Member of the Western Cape Provincial Parliament on 3 August 2022. On 11 August 2022, Murray was elected unopposed as chairperson of the Standing Committee on Finance, Economic Opportunities and Tourism.

References

External links

Profile at Western Cape Provincial Parliament

Living people
1994 births
Democratic Alliance (South Africa) politicians
Members of the Western Cape Provincial Parliament
Women members of provincial legislatures of South Africa
21st-century South African politicians
21st-century South African women politicians
Alumni of Brunel University London
Alumni of SOAS University of London